Al Dhaid is a United Arab Emirates professional football (soccer) club. It is based in Dhaid, on the outskirts of the Emirate of Sharjah. The club plays in the UAE First Division League. Their colors are white and purple.

Stadium
Currently the team plays at the 500 capacity Al-Dhaid Stadium.

Current squad 

As of UAE Division One:

External links
 Al Dhaid SC at Soccerway
 
 

Thaid
Sport in the Emirate of Sharjah
Association football clubs established in 1980
1980 establishments in the United Arab Emirates
Al Dhaid SC